Mostaccino (in the local dialect) is a spicy cookie typical of Crema, Lombardy, Italy. Mainly used in the preparation of the filling of tortelli cremaschi, it includes nutmeg, cinnamon, cloves, mace, cilantro, star anise, black pepper and cocoa among the ingredients. It has a spicy flavour.

History
Mostaccino was already known in seventeenth-century cuisine. Once widespread throughout Lombardy, it is now only found in the town of Crema and its surroundings.

Notes

Bibliography

External links
 Mostaccino's recipe

Biscuits
Italian desserts
Province of Cremona
Cuisine of Lombardy